Mehruiyeh-ye Pain (also Romanized as Mehrū’īyeh-ye Pā’īn; also known as Mehrūeeyeh-ye Pāeen) is a village in Mehruiyeh Rural District, in the Central District of Faryab County, Kerman Province, Iran. At the 2006 census, its population was 891, in 167 families.

References 

Populated places in Faryab County